Eighty-three songs are included in Rock Band 3, a 2010 music video game developed by Harmonix, published by MTV Games and distributed by Electronic Arts. The game, the third main title in the Rock Band series, was released in October 2010 for the Xbox 360, PlayStation 3, Wii, and Nintendo DS. Rock Band 3 allows one to seven players to simulate the playing of rock music by providing the players with peripherals modeled after musical instruments. These include a guitar peripheral for lead guitar and bass gameplay, a drum kit peripheral, a keyboard peripheral, and up to three microphones. Rock Band 3 is the first game in the series to include a "Pro" mode, which allows players to use more realistic peripherals to play the game's songs note-for-note as they would be played on an actual instrument.

All of the songs included in Rock Band 3 were recorded either from master copies or live performances. Many were included to emphasize the keyboard instrument. Existing game content, including prior downloadable content and songs from the Rock Band Network, carries forward into Rock Band 3, with the full Rock Band library consisting of over 2,000 songs by the time the game was released. When Rock Band 3 was first detailed on June 11, 2010, Harmonix announced 22 of the game's songs. The next month, Harmonix used Facebook and Twitter to provide clues about additional songs for both Rock Band 3 and Dance Central, which they then confirmed to be six Rock Band tracks and three Dance Central tracks. During a video interview at the 2010 Gamescom convention, most of the setlist was inadvertently leaked because someone was scrolling through the setlist in the background. Rock Band 3'''s setlist was well-received by video game critics. Eurogamer's Johnny Minkley noted the contrast between it and the heavier style of Guitar Hero: Warriors of Rock's setlist.

 Announcement 
When Rock Band 3 was first detailed on June 11, 2010, Harmonix announced 22 of the game's 83 songs. The next month, Harmonix used Facebook and Twitter to provide clues about additional songs for both Rock Band 3 and Dance Central, which they then confirmed to be six Rock Band tracks and three Dance Central tracks. On August 17, just before the 2010 Gamescom convention, Harmonix announced an additional ten songs by bands from around the world.

During a video interview at Gamescom, most of the setlist was inadvertently leaked because someone was scrolling through the setlist in the background. Harmonix released a video response to the leak the next day, officially denying the rumored setlist, while once again showing the setlist in the background and confirming additional songs. The full setlist was formally announced on August 25 on the Rock Band website.

 Track listing 
The full Rock Band 3 setlist features 83 songs, including a mix of tracks which make use of the new keyboard peripheral and three-part vocal harmonies. The Nintendo DS version of the game features a 25-song subset of the consoles' setlist.

All 83 songs from the Rock Band 3 setlist can be exported into Rock Band 4, as of early December 2015, as long as the player has previously played Rock Band 3 on the same store account for Xbox Live or PlayStation Network.

 Downloadable songs 

Following the release of Rock Band 3, Harmonix has kept up their commitment to releasing weekly downloadable content for the series, starting with a set of twelve songs from the Doors released the same week as the game. Downloadable songs since the game's release include, when appropriate, support for keyboards and vocal harmonies within the base cost of the song. Downloaded content released by Harmonix after Rock Band 3s release is not compatible with previous games in the series due to changes in the song format. Since the game's release, Harmonix has released downloadable songs from a variety of artists, including Bon Jovi, Queen, Billy Joel, Linkin Park, and the Clash.

Most songs already released as downloadable content for the series can be used in Rock Band 3, with the exception of the tracks "Hier Kommt Alex" by Die Toten Hosen, and "Rock 'n' Roll Star" by Oasis. In addition, the songs from many previous Rock Band games can be exported for use in Rock Band 3. More than 2000 potential songs were available at the game's launch between these sources.

Rock Band Network songs are also playable in Rock Band 3. A new version of the Network, called Rock Band Network 2.0, allows songs to be authored with harmonies, Basic and Pro Keys, and Pro Drums, but does not support Pro Guitar and Pro Bass charting due to the complexity of authoring those parts and the number of users able to test them.

 Reception Rock Band 3's setlist was well-received by video game critics. Eurogamer's Johnny Minkley called it "strong and varied", and noted the contrast between it and the heavier style of Guitar Hero: Warriors of Rock's setlist. Will Tuttle of GameSpy praised it as being "the most diverse track list in the franchise's history." G4 TV's Stephen Johnson noted that the addition of the keyboard controller led to the setlist having a more pop-oriented style than the previous games in the series, and he said that Harmonix chose "substance ... over flashy, current bands." Reviewer Ben Kuchera, of Ars Technica, also praised the setlist's variety, stating that it is "one of the best you'll see in rhythm games, spanning decades and genres and bringing a wide variety of songs to suit any taste." In his review of the game in The Atlantic'', Sam Machkovech summed up the setlist by saying that "with keyboards are in  the mix, the songs are just plain better."

References

External links 
 List of songs available for Rock Band 3 at rockband.com.

Rock Band 3
Lists of songs in music video games